Urshult is a locality situated in Tingsryd Municipality, Kronoberg County, Sweden with 794 inhabitants in 2010.

A variety of apple, dark red and harvested in December, was named after the village. The village has a church which was built in 1808.

References 

Populated places in Kronoberg County
Populated places in Tingsryd Municipality